Scala or SCALA may refer to:

Automobiles
 Renault Scala, multiple automobile models
 Škoda Scala, a Czech compact hatchback

Music
 Scala (band), an English electronic music group
 Escala (group), an electronic string quartet formerly known as Scala
 La Scala (album), an album by Keith Jarrett
 Scala, an album by This Heat
 Scala & Kolacny Brothers, a Belgian women's choir
 Scala Records, a 1911–27 British record label
 Scala Radio, a classical music digital radio station launched in 2019
 SCALA (Songwriters, Composers, and Lyricists Association) - see Adelaide music organizations

Organizations
 Scala (company), video software company
 SCALA, the student chapter of the American Library Association

People
 Alessandra Scala (1475–1506), Italian poet and scholar
 Bartolomeo Scala (1430–1497), Italian politician, author and historian
 Delia Scala (1929–2004), Italian ballerina and actress
 Enea Scala (born 1979), Italian operatic tenor
 Flaminio Scala (1547–1624), Italian actor
 Gaetano Scala (born 1932), Italian pentathlete
 Gia Scala (1934–1972), Anglo-American actress
 Jerry Scala (1924–1993), American baseball player
 Lauren Scala (born 1982), American television reporter
 Mim Scala (born 1940), English talent agent
 Nevio Scala (born 1947), Italian soccer coach
 Salvatore Scala (1944–2008), New York mobster
 Tina Scala (1935-2022), Italian-American actress
 Vincenzo Scala ( 1839–1893), Italian painter

Places and buildings

Australia
 La Scala, Fortitude Valley, heritage-listed house in Brisbane, Australia

Italy
 La Scala, an opera house in Milan, Italy
 La Scala, San Miniato, a village in the province of Pisa, Italy
 Scala, Campania, a village on the Amalfi Coast in Italy

Thailand
 Scala Cinema (Bangkok), a cinema (movie theater) in Bangkok, Thailand

United Kingdom
 Scala (club), a nightclub in London
 Scala Theatre, a 1772–1969 theatre in London
 The Scala (Oxford), later Phoenix Picturehouse cinema, Oxford, England
 The Scala Picture House (1912–2008, later Cine City, Withington), Manchester, England

Science and technology

Computing
 FF Scala (1990), a typeface by Martin Majoor
 FF Scala Sans (1993), a typeface by Martin Majoor
 Scala (programming language), a functional/object-oriented programming language
 Scala (software), a program for creating musical scales

Species
 Trigonostoma scala a species of sea snail in the family Cancellariidae
 Turbonilla scala, a species of sea snail in the family Pyramidellidae
 Veprecula scala, a species of sea snail in the family Raphitomidae

Other uses
 Scala case, a 1978 fire in Barcelona and the ensuing trial

See also
 Scalar (disambiguation)
 Scale (disambiguation)
 Scali (disambiguation)
 Skala (disambiguation)
 Escala (disambiguation)